Randy Brown (born July 8, 1990) is a Jamaican-American mixed martial artist currently competing as a welterweight in the Ultimate Fighting Championship. A professional since 2014, he has formerly competed for Ring of Combat and became the Welterweight Ring of Combat Champion in 2015.

Background
Brown was born in Springfield, Massachusetts to Jamaican parents, but moved to Spanish Town, Jamaica as a toddler with his mother as she was deported. His father was convicted for double life sentences and has been incarcerated for most of Randy's life. Randy moved back to the United States at the age of 16 and attended Jamaica High School. He started boxing in 2005 before transitioning to mixed martial arts at the age of 19 and had 6 amateur fights before turning pro in 2014. Brown has a son.

Mixed martial arts career

Early career
Brown began his professional fighting career in 2014, making his professional debut at Ring of Combat 48. Brown won the fight against Steve Tyrrell via submission in round one. He trains out of Budokan Martial Arts Academy, a Renzo Gracie BJJ affiliate.

Ring of Combat
Brown had 6 fights in the promotion winning all 6 by stoppage in the first or second round. He won the Ring of Combat welterweight belt by beating Mike Winters by second-round TKO.

Ultimate Fighting Championship
Brown was featured on Dana Whites Looking For A Fight where he knocked out Robert Plotkin at Ring of Combat 53. He was signed to the UFC soon after.

Brown made his promotional debut against Matt Dwyer on January 30, 2016 at UFC on Fox: Johnson vs. Bader. Brown won the fight via unanimous decision.

Brown faced Michael Graves on April 16, 2016 at UFC on Fox 19. He lost the fight via submission in the second round.

Brown returned to face Erick Montaño on September 17, 2016 at UFC Fight Night 94. He won the fight via submission in the third round.

Brown was expected to face promotional newcomer Charlie Ward on December 9, 2016 at UFC Fight Night 102. However, Ward was pulled from the event due in early November due to alleged visa issues which restricted his travel and was replaced by fellow newcomer Brian Camozzi. Brown won the fight via TKO in the second round.

Brown was expected to face George Sullivan on February 11, 2017 at UFC 208. However, on January 26, Sullivan was pulled from the card after being notified by USADA of a potential anti-doping violation stemming from an out-of-competition sample collected earlier this year. Belal Muhammad was the eventual replacement. Brown lost the fight via unanimous decision.

Brown faced Mickey Gall on November 4, 2017 at UFC 217. He won the fight by unanimous decision.

Brown faced Niko Price on July 14, 2018 at UFC Fight Night 133. He lost the fight via knockout in the second round after Price landed several hammerfists from the bottom to knock Brown out.

Brown was expected to face Chance Rencountre on January 19, 2019 at UFC Fight Night 143. However, Brown pulled out of the fight in early January for undisclosed reasons.

Brown faced Bryan Barberena on June 22, 2019 at UFC Fight Night 154. He won the fight via TKO in the third round.

Brown faced Warlley Alves at UFC Fight Night 164 on November 16, 2019. He won the fight via a triangle choke submission in the second round. This win earned him the Performance of the Night award.

Brown was scheduled to face Vicente Luque on April 11, 2020 at UFC Fight Night: Overeem vs. Harris. Due to the COVID-19 pandemic, the event was eventually postponed.

The bout with Luque was rescheduled and took place on August 1, 2020 at UFC Fight Night: Brunson vs. Shahbazyan. Brown lost the fight by knockout in the second round.

Brown was expected to face Alex Oliveira on February 27, 2021 at UFC Fight Night 186. However, Brown pulled out of the fight during the week leading up to the event due to undisclosed reasons. The pair was rescheduled and they eventually met at UFC 261 on April 24, 2021. Brown won the fight via a one-armed rear naked choke in the first round.

Brown faced Jared Gooden on October 9, 2021 at UFC Fight Night 194. At the weight-ins, Gooden weighted 174 pounds, three pounds over the limit of non-championship welterweight bouts. The bout proceeded to a catchweight bout. Gooden was fined 20% of his purse and it went to Brown. He won the fight via unanimous decision.

Brown faced Khaos Williams on May 7, 2022 at UFC 274. He won the fight via split decision.

Brown faced Francisco Trinaldo on October 1, 2022 at UFC Fight Night 211. He won the bout via unanimous decision.

Brown faced Jack Della Maddalena on February 12, 2023 at UFC 284. He lost the bout via first round submission.

Professional grappling career

Brown is scheduled to compete in the main event of Rise Invitational 11 on April 1, 2023 against 10th Planet black belt Rene Sousa.

Championships and achievements

Mixed martial arts
 Ultimate Fighting Championship
Performance of the Night (One time) 
Ring of Combat
 Ring of Combat welterweight champion (One time)
Two successful title defenses
MMAjunkie.com
2021 April Submission of the Month vs. Alex Oliveira

Mixed martial arts record

|-
|Loss
|align=center|16–5
|Jack Della Maddalena
|Submission (rear-naked choke)
|UFC 284
|
|align=center|1
|align=center|2:13
|Perth, Australia 
|
|-
|Win
|align=center|16–4
|Francisco Trinaldo
|Decision (unanimous)
|UFC Fight Night: Dern vs. Yan
|
|align=center|3
|align=center|5:00
|Las Vegas, Nevada, United States
|
|-
|Win
|align=center|15–4
|Khaos Williams
|Decision (split)
|UFC 274
|
|align=center|3
|align=center|5:00
|Phoenix, Arizona, United States
|
|-
|Win
|align=center|14–4
|Jared Gooden
|Decision (unanimous)
|UFC Fight Night: Dern vs. Rodriguez
|
|align=center|3
|align=center|5:00
|Las Vegas, Nevada, United States
|
|-
|Win
|align=center|13–4
|Alex Oliveira
|Submission (rear-naked choke)
|UFC 261
|
|align=center|1
|align=center|2:50
|Jacksonville, Florida, United States
|
|-
|Loss
|align=center|12–4
|Vicente Luque
|KO (knee and punches)
|UFC Fight Night: Brunson vs. Shahbazyan 
|
|align=center|2
|align=center|4:56
|Las Vegas, Nevada, United States
|
|-
|Win
|align=center|12–3
|Warlley Alves
|Submission (triangle choke)	
|UFC Fight Night: Błachowicz vs. Jacaré 
|
|align=center|2
|align=center|1:22
|São Paulo, Brazil
|
|-
|Win
|align=center|11–3
|Bryan Barberena
|TKO (punches)
|UFC Fight Night: Moicano vs. The Korean Zombie 
|
|align=center|3
|align=center|2:54
|Greenville, South Carolina, United States
|
|-
|Loss
|align=center|10–3
|Niko Price
|KO (punches)
|UFC Fight Night: dos Santos vs. Ivanov 
|
|align=center|2
|align=center|1:09
|Boise, Idaho, United States
|
|-  
|Win
|align=center|10–2
|Mickey Gall
|Decision (unanimous)
|UFC 217
|
|align=center|3
|align=center|5:00
|New York City, New York, United States
|
|-
|Loss
|align=center|9–2
|Belal Muhammad
|Decision (unanimous)
|UFC 208
|
|align=center|3
|align=center|5:00
|Brooklyn, New York, United States
|
|-
|Win
|align=center|9–1
|Brian Camozzi
|TKO (knee and punches)
|UFC Fight Night: Lewis vs. Abdurakhimov
|
|align=center|2
|align=center|1:25
|Albany, New York, United States
|
|-
|Win
|align=center|8–1
|Erick Montaño
|Submission (guillotine choke)
|UFC Fight Night: Poirier vs. Johnson
|
|align=center|3
|align=center|0:18
|Hidalgo, Texas, United States
|
|-
|Loss
|align=center|7–1
|Michael Graves
|Submission (rear-naked choke)
|UFC on Fox: Teixeira vs. Evans
|
|align=center|2
|align=center|2:31
|Tampa, Florida, United States
| 
|-
|Win
|align=center|7–0
|Matt Dwyer
|Decision (unanimous)
|UFC on Fox: Johnson vs. Bader 
|
|align=center|3
|align=center|5:00
|Newark, New Jersey, United States
|
|-
|Win
|align=center|6–0
|Robert Plotkin
|KO (knee)
|Ring of Combat 53 
|
|align=center|1
|align=center|4:23
|Atlantic City, New Jersey, United States
|
|-
|Win
|align=center| 5–0 
|Ben Brewer
|Submission (guillotine choke)
|Ring of Combat 52
|
|align=center| 2
|align=center| 0:31
|Atlantic City, New Jersey, United States
|
|-
|Win
|align=center| 4–0
|Rocky Edwards
|TKO (punches)
|Ring of Combat 51
|
|align=center| 2
|align=center| 4:25
|Atlantic City, New Jersey, United States
|
|-
|Win
|align=center| 3–0
|Mike Winters
|TKO (punches)
|Ring of Combat 50
|
|align=center| 2
|align=center| 1:11
|Atlantic City, New Jersey, United States
|
|-
| Win
|align=center| 2–0
|Leonard Simpson
|TKO (punches)
|Ring of Combat 49
| 
|align=center| 2
|align=center| 0:52
|Atlantic City, New Jersey, United States
|
|-
| Win
|align=center| 1–0
|Steve Tyrrell
|Submission (armbar)
|Ring of Combat 48
|
|align=center| 1
|align=center| 1:53
|Atlantic City, New Jersey, United States
|
|-

See also
 List of current UFC fighters
 List of male mixed martial artists

References

External links

 

1990 births
Living people
American male mixed martial artists
Jamaican male mixed martial artists
American practitioners of Brazilian jiu-jitsu
Jamaican practitioners of Brazilian jiu-jitsu
Sportspeople from Springfield, Massachusetts
Sportspeople from Kingston, Jamaica
American sportspeople of Jamaican descent
American emigrants to Jamaica
Welterweight mixed martial artists
Mixed martial artists utilizing Brazilian jiu-jitsu
People from Spanish Town
Ultimate Fighting Championship male fighters